Ted de Lyster (born 17 June 1947) is an Australian former association football player.

Playing career

Club career
De Lyster played for South Australian teams Campbelltown and West Adelaide Hellas.

International career
He made his full international debut for Australia in November 1967 in a match against Indonesia in Jakarta. He played his second and final match against Singapore in the same month. He also played two further matches that were considered B-internationals against a Jakarta XI and a Combined Services XI.

References

1947 births
Australian soccer players
Australia international soccer players
Living people
Association football forwards